is a town located in Kamikawa Subprefecture, Hokkaido, Japan.

As of September 2016, the town has an estimated population of 10,385, and a density of 150 persons per km2. The total area is 68.64 km2.

Asahikawa Airport is partially in Asahikawa and partially in Higashikagura.

Climate

Culture

Mascot

She is a flower fairy who has a tulip motif. She is also a bringer of luck. If you want her to bring luck, make a "L" hand signal and she will appear.

References

External links

Official Website 

Towns in Hokkaido